Turning loops of the Toronto streetcar system serve as termini and turnback points for streetcar routes in Toronto, Ontario, Canada. The single-ended streetcars require track loops in order to reverse direction. Besides short off-street track loops these can also be larger interchange points, having shelters and driver facilities, or be part of a subway station structure for convenient passenger interchange.

Some loops include separate unloading and loading stops, some have a single stop, and some off-street loops have no stops and passengers are not allowed to ride around the loop. If streetcars loop clockwise, the track entering the loop must cross over the track exiting, and any loading or unloading platforms must be inside the loop; if anticlockwise, any platforms must be on the outside.

Current loops

Loops have various shapes according to the space available. For example, the "loop" track may actually be mostly straight, using on-street trackage to complete the looping motion (as at Bingham Loop, Dufferin Gate Loop, or Oakwood Loop), or there may be a single sharp curve through almost three-quarters of a circle (as at Union Station Loop or Wolseley Loop).

Some loops consist only of a single track and are blocked when occupied by a stopped streetcar. Others have a side track or dead-end "tail track" where a streetcar can wait, or a track that allows a streetcar on the loop to make a complete circle (or equivalent) and reenter the loop.

Loops at subway stations

Bathurst station loop

Bathurst station features an anticlockwise loop, which is the northern terminus of the 511 Bathurst route, on the east side of Bathurst Street north of Bloor Street. The tracks continue north of the station to connect to the Hillcrest Complex and St. Clair Avenue. Streetcars can enter or leave the station from/onto Bathurst either northbound or southbound.

Broadview station loop

Broadview station features an anticlockwise loop, which is the eastern terminus of the 504B King and 505 Dundas routes, on the east side of Broadview Avenue north of Danforth Avenue. The loop track splits into two, one for each route. All streetcars enter the station from Broadview northbound, and exit onto Erindale Avenue westbound, leading to Broadview southbound.

Dundas West station loop

Dundas West station features a clockwise loop, which is the western terminus of the 504A King and 505 Dundas routes, on the west (nominally south) side of Dundas Street north of Bloor Street. The loop track splits into two, one for each route. All streetcars enter the station from Dundas northbound (nominally westbound), and exit onto Edna Avenue eastbound, leading to Dundas southbound.

Main Street station loop

Main Street station features a clockwise loop, which is the eastern terminus of the 506 Carlton route, on the east side of Main Street north of Danforth Avenue. All streetcars enter the station from Main northbound, and exit onto Main southbound.

Spadina station loop

Spadina station features an anticlockwise underground loop, which is the northern terminus of the 510 Spadina route, on the east side of Spadina Road north of Bloor Street A tunnel runs from Spadina Avenue and Washington Avenue to the station. All streetcars enter the tunnel northbound on Spadina, turn eastbound under Bloor, northbound under Madison Avenue, and westbound into the station; they exit southbound under Spadina Road and Avenue.

St. Clair station loop

St. Clair station features an anticlockwise loop, which is the eastern terminus of the 512 St. Clair route, on the south side of St. Clair Avenue east of Yonge Street. All streetcars enter the station from St. Clair eastbound, and exit onto St. Clair westbound.

St. Clair West station loop

St. Clair West station features a clockwise underground loop, an intermediate stop and possible turnback point on the 512 St. Clair route, on the north side of St. Clair Avenue two blocks east of Bathurst Street. Before the introduction of the longer Flexity cars, there were separate unloading, eastbound loading, and westbound loading stops on the same track; now there are only two stops, eastbound and westbound. A side track enables eastbound cars to bypass the westbound stop. A tunnel runs under St. Clair from Wells Hill Avenue halfway to Tweedsmuir Avenue. Streetcars can enter or leave the station from/into this tunnel either eastbound or westbound.

Union station loop

Union station features an anticlockwise underground loop. It is the eastern terminus of the 509 Harbourfront and southern terminus of the 510 Spadina route. A tunnel runs under Bay Street from Queens Quay station. All streetcars enter the station from the tunnel northbound and exit into the tunnel southbound.

Loops at carhouses

Roncesvalles Carhouse loop
It is a possible turnback point for westbound 501 Queen and for 504 King in either direction. Streetcars on King or Queen westbound or Roncesvalles southbound can run onto the Queensway westbound, then turn northbound to enter the loop. They can exit the loop onto Roncesvalles Avenue northbound or southbound, with the latter leading onto the Queensway westbound or King or Queen eastbound.

No passenger access, no use by buses.

Russell Carhouse loop
There is an anticlockwise loop around the traffic office at the corner of Connaught Avenue and Queen Street East that can turn streetcars approaching from the west along Queen Street. There is clockwise looping for streetcars approaching from either east or west along Queen Street via Connaught Avenue, Eastern Avenue, north through the yard tracks returning either to Connaught Avenue or directly onto Queen Street.

No passenger access, no use by buses.

Other off-street loops

Bingham Loop

Bingham is an anticlockwise loop northwest of Kingston Road and Victoria Park Avenue. It is the eastern terminus for 502 Downtowner and 503 Kingston Road streetcars. Prior to mid-2013, it was possible for operators using the loop to loop-the-loop. Westbound 12 Kingston Road buses enter the loop as an intermediate stop, and when the streetcars are not running, 22A Coxwell or 322 Coxwell Blue Night buses use it as a terminus.

Distillery Loop

Distillery is an anticlockwise loop. It is the eastern terminus of the 504A King route, on the east side of Cherry Street opposite Distillery Lane in the Distillery District. The Distillery Loop is at the southern end of the Cherry Street branch, which has a junction with the King Street line at its northern end. With the junction, the Distillery Loop can turn cars coming from either direction along King Street. The loop opened on June 19, 2016.

Dufferin Gate Loop

Dufferin Gate is an anticlockwise loop northwest of Dufferin Street and the Gardiner Expressway. A loop-the-loop manoeuvre is possible. During the Canadian National Exhibition, this loop provides access to the west end of Exhibition Place via the Dufferin Gates, and is the terminus of the 504B King streetcars.

Earlscourt Loop
It is a possible turnback point for westbound 512 St. Clair streetcars and former terminus for 512L St. Clair streetcars. Streetcars from St. Clair in either direction can turn southbound on Lansdowne to enter the loop, and exit onto St. Clair eastbound.

A cabin is provided for drivers. Northbound 47A Lansdowne buses use the loop as a regularly scheduled turnback point.

Exhibition Loop

Exhibition is an anticlockwise loop northeast of Manitoba Drive and Nova Scotia Avenue. It is the western terminus of the 509 Harbourfront and the southern terminus of the 511 Bathurst route. There is a private right-of-way that runs along the north side of Manitoba from Fleet Street at Strachan Avenue to the loop. From Fleet westbound, all streetcars continue west along the private right-of-way to the loop, where they cross north under the elevated Gardiner Expressway, run west, and cross back south under the expressway before returning eastbound to Fleet.

During the Exhibition, this loop allows access to Exhibition Place and is operated as a fare-paid area with ticket booths and turnstiles. At other times these are closed and it is operated as an ordinary stop. Storage tracks are provided so that extra streetcars can be rapidly dispatched for peak traffic, as well as a passing track allowing the two routes to have separate stopping points without conflict.

Exhibition GO Station is adjacent to the loop. Overnight the 307 Bathurst Blue Night and 363 Ossington Blue Night buses use the loop as their southern terminus.

The loop opened in 1996, replacing a previous Exhibition Loop that could not be used by buses and was on land about to be redeveloped.

Fleet Loop

Fleet is anticlockwise loop on the south side of Fleet Street west of Bathurst Street, in the angle with Lake Shore Boulevard, and surrounding the Queen's Wharf Lighthouse. There is no passenger access and no bus access.

Gunns Loop

Gunns is an anticlockwise loop northwest of St. Clair Avenue and at Gunns Road and the western terminus for the 512 St. Clair route. All streetcars westbound on St. Clair turn northbound on Gunns, enter the loop westbound, and exit onto St. Clair eastbound.

High Park Loop

High Park is an anticlockwise loop west of Parkside Drive, opposite Howard Park Avenue, on the east edge of High Park. It is the western terminus for the 506 Carlton route. All streetcars enter the loop from Howard Park westbound and exit onto Howard Park eastbound.

Humber Loop

Humber consists of two separate anticlockwise loops: one loop turns cars coming from the east via the Queensway; the other turns cars coming from the west via Lake Shore Boulevard. It is a turnback point for streetcars on the 501 Queen from Neville Park Loop and Long Branch Loop, located south of the Queensway, just west of the Humber River. The loops are on a section of a private right-of-way that connects tracks on the Queensway to the east and Lake Shore Boulevard to the west.

Kipling Loop

It is a possible turnback point for westbound 501 Queen streetcars. Streetcars can turn from Lake Shore either eastbound or westbound onto Kipling northbound to enter the loop, and exit onto Kipling southbound, leading to Lake Shore eastbound. The loop was once known as New Toronto Loop.

There is no bus access in this loop, although the 44 Kipling South previously looped here until it was extended to the former Lakeshore Asylum. The loop is used by the 145 Humber Bay Express, however.

Long Branch Loop

Long Branch is an anticlockwise loop northwest of Lake Shore Boulevard West and Brown's Line. It is the western terminus for 501 Queen routes.

McCaul Loop

McCaul is an anticlockwise loop northeast of McCaul Street and Stephanie Street. It is the western terminus of the 502 Downtowner and a turnback point for the 501 Queen in either direction. Streetcars travelling both ways on Queen can turn north onto McCaul and then can turn into the loop, exiting onto McCaul southbound to return to Queen either eastbound or westbound. The loop was originally in the open air, but was covered when the Village by the Grange mixed-use development was built over it in 1976.

Neville Park Loop

Neville Park is an anticlockwise loop southwest of Queen Street east and Nursewood Road; eastern terminus of the 501 Queen route. All streetcars enter the loop from Queen eastbound and exit onto Nursewood northbound to return to Queen westbound. It has no passenger access. It is the eastern terminus of 143 Downtown/Beach Express buses.

Oakwood Loop
It is a possible turnback point for route 512 St. Clair in either direction. Streetcars either eastbound or westbound on St. Clair can turn northbound onto Robina Avenue, then westbound to enter the loop, exiting onto Oakwood Avenue southbound to return to St. Clair either eastbound or westbound.

No passenger access. Northern terminus of 63B Ossington buses.

Queen–Coxwell Loop
It is a possible turnback point for route 506 Carlton in either direction. Streetcars either eastbound or westbound on Gerrard Street can turn southbound on Coxwell to reach the loop, then eastbound to enter the loop, exiting onto Queen westbound to return to Coxwell northbound and turn eastbound or westbound onto Gerrard. The loop exit track briefly overlaps the westbound track on Queen but does not connect with it, leading only onto Coxwell northbound.

No passenger access. This loop is not currently used by buses, although up to the mid-1980s, it was the southern terminus of the Coxwell 22 bus line.

Queens Quay and Spadina Loop
It is a possible turnback point for 509 Harbourfront or 510 Spadina streetcars in either direction. Streetcars southbound on Spadina can turn eastbound on Queens Quay to reach the loop; streetcars eastbound or westbound on Queens Quay can turn northbound into the loop. Streetcars exiting the loop can turn northbound on Spadina, or southbound on Spadina to reach Queens Quay eastbound or westbound.
Although not currently used by buses, this loop was the terminus for the former route 77 Spadina bus until 1997. The loop was demolished in 2013 and finished rebuilt in 2015 as part of the Queens Quay Revitalization Project.

Sunnyside Loop

Sunnyside is an anticlockwise loop northeast of the Queensway and Sunnyside Avenue, near the southwest corner of Roncesvalles Carhouse. Streetcars enter westbound on the Queensway and exit southbound on Sunnyside Avenue, returning to the Queensway eastbound. Possible turn back point for the 501 Queen westbound.

Wolseley Loop
It is a possible turnback point for westbound route 501 Queen streetcars, route 504 King in either direction, northbound 511 Bathurst streetcars. Streetcars eastbound or westbound on King Street or westbound on Queen Street can turn northbound on Bathurst, then can turn eastbound on Wolseley to enter the loop northbound, exiting onto Bathurst southbound to return to Queen Street eastbound or King Street eastbound or westbound. The loop is paved to handle buses; however, it has no passenger access. A cabin for drivers is provided.

Woodbine Loop
The loop is a possible turnback point for eastbound route 501 Queen and for 503 Kingston Road in either direction just north of Queen street. Streetcars enter the clockwise loop from Kingston Road East in either direction and exit eastbound only onto Queen Street. Within the loop there are two parallel tracks. The streetcar junction has an east-to-north curve that allow streetcars to turn back onto Kingston Road, or to do a loop-the-loop movement. There is no passenger access.

The name Woodbine refers not to Woodbine Avenue, almost 500 metres to the east, but to the former Woodbine Race Course, which was once directly opposite the loop on the south side of Queen. The racetrack was renamed Greenwood Raceway after the New Woodbine Racetrack opened in another part of the city in 1957; Greenwood Raceway was demolished in 1994. Despite this, the "Woodbine Loop" name persists.

On-street loops
There are two named on-street loops where a streetcar runs entirely in the street around one or two city blocks to reverse.

Charlotte Loop
It is adjacent to the grand union at King Street and Spadina Avenue that complements Charlotte Loop in that one curve of the grand union is needed to reverse direction at the loop. Any streetcar on King Street or Spadina Avenue approaching the grand union can reverse direction via the loop. The loop was opened in 1999 to short-turn southbound 510 Spadina streetcars. For five years, from 2017 to 2022, Charlotte Loop was the temporary western terminal for 503 Kingston Rd streetcars.

College Loop
It is a possible turnback point for routes 505 Dundas and 506 Carlton in either direction. Streetcars can enter and exit the loop from or onto either Dundas or College in either direction.

Unnamed on-street loops
In addition to the above-named locations, there are a number of places in the system where a longer loop around city streets is possible. This is possible in downtown Toronto where there is a grid of streetcar lines supplemented by short sections of non-revenue trackage. Switches at junctions allow streetcars to go around multiple blocks to reverse direction.

Examples:
 The western terminus of the 503 Kingston Road route is an on-street loop running from King Street westbound via Church Street southbound, Wellington Street westbound and York Street northbound returning to King Street eastbound.
 The eastern terminal of the 508 Lake Shore route is an on-street loop running eastbound from King Street via Parliament Street northbound, Dundas Street Street eastbound, Broadview Avenue southbound, and Queen Street then King Street westbound.

Future loops
Three new streetcar loops have been proposed. , none have been approved for construction.

Park Lawn Loop
In 2015, the TTC proposed the construction of Park Lawn Loop near Park Lawn Road and Lake Shore Boulevard. A 2017 TTC report said that Park Lawn Loop would allow more frequent service west to Park Lawn to serve existing and future developments in the area between Humber Loop and Park Lawn Road.

In 2019, the TTC was considering modifying 504B King to run from Broadview station to the new Park Lawn Loop instead of Dufferin Gate Loop. Route 503 Kingston Rd would then be extended west to serve Dufferin Gate Loop.

Riverside Loop
In 2019, the TTC proposed the construction of Riverside Loop on the east side of Broadview Avenue just north of Queen Street East, on lands owned by the TTC but used as a municipal Green-P parking lot. At that time the TTC was considering splitting 501 Queen into two overlapping routes, with 501A operating between Neville Loop and Sunnyside Loop, and 501B operating between Sunnyside Loop and the new Riverside Loop.

Polson Loop
In 2021, the City of Toronto was planning the East Bayfront LRT, a new streetcar line to run on its own right-of-way from Union Station to Toronto's Port Lands. The city considered three locations for a terminus loop: at Parliament Street and Queens Quay East (a temporary loop), at Distillery Loop or at Polson Street. The Polson Loop would be on Villiers Island along the east side of Cherry Street south of Polson Street.

In 2021, a new bridge was installed on a relocated Cherry Street to cross the Keating Channel onto Villiers Island; it would be capable of carrying streetcars to a future Polson Loop.

Former loops

Former wyes 

As an alternative to a loop, a streetcar can also be turned using a manoeuvre similar to a three-point turn, involving at least two switches and a suitable layout of connecting tracks. This can be done if necessary at any intersection or other track junction where suitable tracks exist, but the TTC also had a few wye tracks with no other purpose. No wyes remain in the system; the table shows some of the last ones to be removed.

See also 
 Balloon loop
 Wye (rail)

References

External links 

 TTC Toronto Track Diagram 1966
 Toronto Transit Commission Track Diagram 1973
 TTC Streetcar Track Map (1995)